Massachusetts is a state in the northeastern United States.

Massachusetts may also refer to:

History
Massachusett, the indigenous population after which the Massachusetts Bay Colony was named
Massachusetts Bay Colony (1629–1692)
Province of Massachusetts Bay (1692–1776)

Music
Massachusetts (Lori McKenna album), 2013
Massachusetts (Scud Mountain Boys album) or the title song, 1996
"Massachusetts" (Arlo Guthrie song), 1976; official folk song of Massachusetts
"Massachusetts" (Bee Gees song), 1967
"Massachusetts" (Ylvis song), 2013
"Massachusetts (Because of You Our Land is Free)", written by Bernard Davidson; official patriotic song of Massachusetts
"The State of Massachusetts", a song by the Dropkick Murphys, 2008
"Massachusetts", a song by Silverstein from This Is How the Wind Shifts, 2013
"Massachusetts", a song performed by The Four Vagabonds, 1942
"Massachusetts", a song by Reks from The Greatest X, 2016

Other uses
USS Massachusetts, a name shared by several ships of the United States Navy
4547 Massachusetts, an asteroid
The Massachusetts, a historic apartment building in Indianapolis, Indiana, US

See also
Massachusett language
Massachusett dialects
University of Massachusetts, the entire University of Massachusetts system of schools
University of Massachusetts Amherst, the flagship and largest campus of the University of Massachusetts system
Massachusetts Avenue (disambiguation), streets named after Massachusetts
Fort Massachusetts (disambiguation), various military installations 
Massachusetts Heights, Washington, D.C.